Mbabazi is a surname. Notable people with the surname include:
Amama Mbabazi) (born 1949), Ugandan politician
Esther Mbabazi (born 1949), professional commercial airline pilot in Rwanda
Jacqueline Mbabazi (born 1954), Ugandan educator, politician and businesswoman
Janet Mbabazi (born 1996), Ugandan cricketer
Lillian Mbabazi (born 1984), Rwandan-Ugandan recording artist and entertainer
Pamela Mbabazi (born 1969), Ugandan university professor, academic, and academic administrator
Philbert Aimé Mbabazi (born 1990), Rwandan filmmaker
Rosemary Mbabazi, businesswoman and politician in Rwanda

Surnames of Rwandan origin
Surnames of Ugandan origin